Look East policy refers to the foreign policy of Bangladesh which is designed to promote its relations with East and Southeast Asian countries covering economic, defence, cultural and other interests.

Policy 
The policy is to improve ties with East Asian countries. This includes signing more Bilateral Treaties with Japan and China. The government of Bangladesh is trying to increase economic trade and improve relations with its neighbor Myanmar. Thailand is one of the countries Bangladesh is trying to improve bilateral and trade relationships with.

History 
The Policy was adopted in 2001 after the Bangladesh Nationalist Party led by Khaleda Zia was elected. Khaleda Zia said "The doors are open to us in the west, east, south and north but we are focussing on the east because it is good for us". Bangladesh was motivated by lack of progress in trade deals within SAARC countries and perceived domination of India, which borders Bangladesh on all side and has a trade surplus with it. In 2016 China signed a Memorandum of Understanding to provide Bangladesh with 24.45 billion dollars in bilateral assistance to 34 projects in Bangladesh. This is to date the largest assistance pledged to Bangladesh by any country. China is Bangladesh biggest source of Imports and trading partner.

References

Foreign relations of Bangladesh
Foreign policy doctrines